Dindica purpurata is a moth of the family Geometridae first described by Max Bastelberger in 1911. It is found in Taiwan.

References

Moths described in 1911
Pseudoterpnini